Grabowiec  (German: Buchholz) is a village in the administrative district of Gmina Recz, within Choszczno County, West Pomeranian Voivodeship, in north-western Poland.

See also
 History of Pomerania

References

Grabowiec